Ainārs is a Latvian masculine given name and may refer to:
Ainārs Bagatskis (born 1967), Latvian basketball player and coach.
Ainars Baštiks (born 1958), Latvian politician.
Ainārs Juškēvičs (born 1981), Latvian floorball player.
Ainārs Ķiksis (born 1972), Latvian cyclist.
Ainārs Kovals (born 1981), Latvian javelin thrower and Olympic medalist.
Ainārs Podnieks (born 1980), Latvian bobsledder.
Ainārs Podziņš (born 1992), Latvian ice hockey player.
Ainārs Šlesers (born 1970), Latvian businessman and politician.
Ainars Zvirgzdiņš (born 1959), Latvian basketball coach.

Latvian masculine given names